Astro Glacier is a glacier in Antarctica, between the Turner Hills and Tricorn Peak in the Miller Range, flowing northeast into the Marsh Glacier. It was seen by the northern party of the New Zealand Geological Survey Antarctic Expedition (1961–62) and so named because an astronomical station was set up on the bluff at the mouth of the glacier in December 1961.

See also
 List of glaciers in the Antarctic
 Glaciology

References
 

Glaciers of Oates Land